, is a Japanese theatre actor. Originally a member of the Tokyo Sunshine Boys theatrical troupe, he now works mainly with the Gekidan Shinkansen troupe.

He is known for being very short in stature, but very noisy and wild on stage, specializing in comedy. He had a problem reading kanji (Chinese characters) and insists that his roles have long, complicated, difficult-to-remember names.

Selected works

Films
 12 Gentle Japanese (1991)
 Welcome Back, Mr. McDonald (1997)
 Minna no Ie (2001)
 The Uchoten Hotel (2006)
 Galaxy Turnpike (2015)
 Black Widow Business (2016)
 Masquerade Hotel (2019)
 Hit Me Anyone One More Time (2019)
 Masquerade Night (2021)
 The Confidence Man JP: Episode of the Hero (2022)
 Do Unto Others (2023)
 Daimyō Tōsan (2023)

Television
 Furikaereba Yatsu ga Iru (1993)
 Furuhata Ninzaburō (1994–99)
 Oosama no Restaurant (1995)
 The Emperor's Cook (2015) – Emperor Hirohito
 Here Comes Asa! (2015) – Genkichi Miyabe
 The 13 Lords of the Shogun (2022) – Zenji
 DCU: Deep Crime Unit (2022) – Hideki Bando (Ep. 2)

Notes

External links

1966 births
People from Okayama
Living people
Japanese male film actors
Japanese male stage actors
Japanese male television actors
20th-century Japanese male actors
21st-century Japanese male actors